Phloeophagus is a genus of true weevils in the beetle family Curculionidae. There are more than 30 described species in Phloeophagus.

Species
These 39 species belong to the genus Phloeophagus:

 Phloeophagus aeneopicea Boheman & C.H., 1845
 Phloeophagus aeneopiceus Boheman, 1845
 Phloeophagus apionides Horn, 1873
 Phloeophagus appenhageni Uyttenboogaart, 1930
 Phloeophagus aterrimus Hampe, 1850
 Phloeophagus brignolii Osella, Zuppa & Lodos, 1993
 Phloeophagus californicus Van Dyke, 1927
 Phloeophagus canadensis Van Dyke, 1927
 Phloeophagus cossonoides Motschulsky, 1863
 Phloeophagus depressus Montrouzier & X., 1860
 Phloeophagus ebeninus Boheman, 1838
 Phloeophagus fallax Boheman, 1838
 Phloeophagus ferrugineus Boheman, 1838
 Phloeophagus filum Roudier, 1958
 Phloeophagus hispidus Boheman, 1838
 Phloeophagus iranicus Osella, Zuppa & Lodos, 1993
 Phloeophagus lignarius Schoenherr, 1838
 Phloeophagus linearis Boheman, 1845
 Phloeophagus marginalis Marshall, 1930
 Phloeophagus minimus Boheman, 1838
 Phloeophagus minor Horn, 1873
 Phloeophagus orientalis Osella, 1974
 Phloeophagus pallidus Boheman, 1845
 Phloeophagus pawlowskii Kuska, 1984
 Phloeophagus protensus (Wollaston, 1873)
 Phloeophagus scalptus Schoenherr, 1845
 Phloeophagus sculptus Gyllenhal, 1838
 Phloeophagus seriesetosulus Voss, 1960
 Phloeophagus silbermanni Boheman, 1838
 Phloeophagus solidus Voss, 1965
 Phloeophagus spadix Schoenherr, 1838
 Phloeophagus sucinopunctatus Kuska, 1992
 Phloeophagus tenax Wollaston & T.V., 1854
 Phloeophagus thompsoni (Grill, 1896)
 Phloeophagus turbatus Boheman, 1845
 Phloeophagus ulimi Kuska, 1982
 Phloeophagus uncipes Boheman, 1838
 Phloeophagus variolatus Dury, 1916
 Phloeophagus vossi Osella, 1974

References

Further reading

External links

 

Cossoninae
Articles created by Qbugbot